Tensobentenga is a department or commune of Kouritenga Province in eastern Burkina Faso. Its capital lies at the town of Tensobentenga . According to the 1996 census the department has a total population of 18,746.

Towns and villages
 Tensobentenga (1 462 inhabitants) (capital)
 Dakonsin (786 inhabitants) 
 Bogodin (123 inhabitants) 
 Doubguin (517 inhabitants) 
 Doure Yarcé (676 inhabitants) 
 Goguin (354 inhabitants) 
 Gonsin (1 049 inhabitants) 
 Kombestenga (1 156 inhabitants) 
 Koulwoko (2 187 inhabitants) 
 Naikin (931 inhabitants) 
 Naobin (279 inhabitants) 
 Nédoguin (308 inhabitants) 
 Ouamzalin (339 inhabitants) 
 Pistenga (204 inhabitants)  
 Setebtenga (232 inhabitants) 
 Silgtéogo (984 inhabitants) 
 Simpiguin (482 inhabitants) 
 Soansa (516 inhabitants) 
 Soumdi (756 inhabitants) 
 Tampialin (543 inhabitants) 
 Timtenga (813 inhabitants) 
 Tougmetenga (962 inhabitants) 
 Toutgoguin (898 inhabitants) 
 Yabré (613 inhabitants) 
 Zéologuin (1 282 inhabitants) 
 Zomkome (295 inhabitants)

Tensobentenga centre est composer d'habitant très réligieux (Musulmans et chrétiens). Situer à  de Koupéla vers le sud.

References

Departments of Burkina Faso
Kouritenga Province